The Nicholas-Zaretsky Church (Николо-Зарецкий храм) is a church in Tula in Russia. It contains the family vault of the Demidov family of industrialists. Its usual name is the Nicholas-Zaretsky Church, though it has held various others over time.

History
The church originated as two separate 17th century wooden churches on the site, replaced between 1730 and 1734 by a new double-nave church. Akinfiy Nikitich Demidov, son of Nikita Demidov, is considered to be the founder of the new church. It has several side chapels, with paintings of the Nativity, Saint Nicholas, Andrew the Apostle and Tikhon of Kaluga. In 1734 a new crypt chapel was built for burials of the Demidov family. A bell tower in the Yaroslava-Suzdal style was built near the church. In Soviet times the church was closed and used as a warehouse, though it is now back in use as a church.

External links
 Russian Church
 Diocese of Tula and Belevskoy

Churches in Tula Oblast
Baroque church buildings in Russia
1734 establishments in Europe
Russian Orthodox church buildings in Russia
Cultural heritage monuments of federal significance in Tula Oblast